"To A Louse, On Seeing One on a Lady's Bonnet at Church" is a 1786 Scots language poem by Robert Burns  in his favourite meter, standard Habbie. The poem's theme is contained in the final verse:

In this poem the narrator notices a lady in church, with a louse that is roving, unnoticed by her, around in her bonnet. The poet chastises the louse for not realising how important his host is, and then reflects that, to a louse, humans are all equal prey, and that they would be disabused of their pretensions if they were to see themselves through each other's eyes.  An alternative interpretation is that the poet is musing to himself how horrified and humbled the pious woman would be if she were aware she was harbouring a common parasite in her hair.

See also 
 To a Mouse

References 

1786 poems
Poetry by Robert Burns
1786 in Scotland
Scots-language works